WLFZ (101.9 FM) is a commercial radio station licensed to Springfield, Illinois, and serving Central Illinois.  It is owned by Saga Communications and has a country music radio format.  The radio studios and offices are on East Sangamon Avenue in Springfield.

WLFZ has an effective radiated power (ERP) of 50,000 watts, the current maximum for most FM stations in Illinois.  The transmitter is on Canadian Cross Road in Springfield, near Exit 90 of Interstate 55.

History
On , the station first signed on the air.  Its original call sign was WVEM and it broadcast a middle of the road music format that was mostly automated.

In 1993, it was purchased by Saga Communications, which switched the call letters to WQQL.  It aired an oldies format as "Cool 101.9".  It continued with its oldies sound for the next two decades.

Saga Communications changed the format to country music and the call letters to WLFZ on October 2, 2013. The 101.9 frequency's WQQL call letters were moved to 93.9 and the format was, in the process, changed to classic hits as "Cool 93.9". Concurrently, the adult hits format of the 93.9 signal, "93.9 ABE FM", was moved to translator 101.1 FM (W266BZ-FM at 250 Watts), which is now known as classic country "101.1 The Outlaw."  It also broadcasts on WDBR-HD2 featuring the same format and branding. WLFZ's has one country competitor in the Springfield market, 104.5 WFMB-FM, owned by Neuhoff Media.

References

External links

Saga Communications Website

Sangamon County, Illinois
LFZ